Ilira Gashi (born 29 October 1994), known professionally as just Ilira, is a Swiss singer and songwriter. In 2018, she signed to Four Music and released her debut single "Whisper My Name".

Early life 
Ilira Gashi was born on 29 October 1994 in Brienz, Switzerland, to a Kosovo Albanian father from Pristina, Kosovo and an Albanian mother from Tirana, Albania. She uploaded videos of herself singing on Instagram, which led to a record label deal.

Career 
In 2011, Ilira and her band The Colors competed in the Swiss show Die grosse Entscheidungs Show, the pre-selection show for the Eurovision Song Contest 2011. Their song "Home" came in third. Ilira later moved to Berlin, Germany and signed a management and publishing deal with Sony/ATV Music Publishing. 

In 2018, Ilira signed a label deal with Four Music, and released her debut track "Whisper My Name" on 24 August 2018, followed by her second single "Get Off My D!ck" that same year which entered the Spotify Viral Top 50 in the U.S. Her first chart placement was achieved together with Alle Farben and the song "Fading", which reached number 16 on the German Single Charts and number 1 on the German Airplay Charts for four consecutive weeks.

In 2019, Ilira released four singles, "Do It Yourself", "Diablo" (with Spanish producer and recording artist Juan Magán), "Pay Me Back!", and "Extra Fr!es".

In 2020, she released the singles "Royalty", "Fuck It, I Love It!", "Ladida (My Heart Goes Boom)" (together with Crispie), "Easy", and "Eat My Brain".

On December 14, 2021 Ilira announced that she had signed a joint deal with Virgin Records and Universal Music Group. She released the single "Flowers" on December 17, 2021 as her first solo single of 2021, and her first single under Virgin Records. In 2022, she released the single "Another Heart".

Discography

Singles

As lead artist

As featured artist

Notes

Awards and nominations

References

External links 

 Official website

1994 births
21st-century Swiss women singers
Living people
People from Brienz
Swiss people of Albanian descent
Swiss people of Kosovan descent
Swiss songwriters